Piro people  were a Native American tribe who lived in New Mexico during the 16th and 17th century. (The Piros (not to be confused with the Piros of the Ucayali basin in Peru) They lived in a number of pueblos in the Rio Grande Valley around modern Socorro, New Mexico, USA. The now extinct Piro language may have been a Tanoan language. Numbering several thousand at the time of first contact with the Spanish, by the time of the Pueblo Revolt in 1680 the Piro had been decimated by European-introduced diseases and Apache attacks and most of the survivors resettled near El Paso, Texas.

History
The Piro were closely related to the Tompiro who lived to their northeast in the Salinas region of New Mexico. Both peoples are believed by most authorities to have spoken Tanoan languages. Beyond the narrow ribbon of green along the Rio Grande the surrounding hinterlands are desert.  
 
The Piro people, along with several other Puebloan peoples, were probably descendants of the Mogollon culture, the Ancestral Puebloans (Anasazi), and the Casas Grandes peoples. These cultures flourished until about 1450 in a large area of the southwestern United States and neighboring Mexico. The 15th century population of the Piro is estimated to have been about seven thousand people.  The Piro's largest town, called San Pascual Pueblo by the Spanish, had 1,500 rooms and a population of about 2,000 people.

Some Piros were hospitable to the first Spanish colonists who arrived in 1598. As a result, the Spanish gave first one, then another, Piro pueblo the name Socorro, which means "aid" or "help" (in case of problems or difficulties). In later years, however, the Piros like most other Pueblo groups suffered increasingly from the strains of colonial rule. Local rebellions broke out on several occasions in the 1660s and 1670s, but the Spaniards always retained the upper hand. By the time of the Pueblo Revolt of 1680, the Piro communities had declined to such an extent that the famous rebellion took place without them. Several hundred Piros (and Tiwas) accompanied the fleeing Spaniards south to El Paso del Norte (present-day Ciudad Juárez, Mexico); others scattered and joined other Pueblo groups. None of the Piro pueblos were ever resettled by the original inhabitants.

Today, the Piro people are part of the Piro-Manso-Tiwa Tribe of San Juan de Guadalupe Pueblo in Las Cruces, New Mexico as well as in Tortugas Pueblo.

Currently, there is a long-term archaeological project at the Piro pueblo of Tzelaqui/Sevilleta north of present-day Socorro.

Piro pueblos
Teypana
Pilabó
San Pascual Pueblo
Senecú

See also 
 Sevilleta National Wildlife Refuge
 Tompiro Indians

References

External links
La provincia de los Piros
 Piros Indian Tribe Pueblo

Further reading
Bletzer, Michael P., 'The First Province of that Kingdom': Notes on the Colonial History of the Piro Area. New Mexico Historical Review 88(4): 437-459 (2013) /  
Bletzer, Michael P., A House for Fray Alonso: The Search for Pilabo Pueblo and the First Piro Mission, Nuestra Senora del Socorro. El Palacio 120(3): 34-37 (2015) /  
Marshall, Michael P., and Henry J. Walt, Rio Abajo: Prehistory and History of a Rio Grande Province (Santa Fe: New Mexico Historic Preservation Division, 1984.)

Native American tribes in New Mexico
Tanoan languages
Tiwa Puebloans
Languages of the United States
Indigenous languages of the North American Southwest
Puebloan buildings and structures